Strangalepta is a genus containing only one species, Strangalepta abbreviata, a longhorned beetle in the family Cerambycidae.

References

Further reading

External links

 

Lepturinae